Out of the Clouds is a 1955 British drama film directed by Basil Dearden and starring Anthony Steel, Robert Beatty and James Robertson Justice. An Ealing Studios production, the film is composed of small stories dealing with the passengers and crew on a day at London Airport (the name of Heathrow Airport 1946–1966).

Plot
During a day at an airport in London, many complications arise, involving both passengers and airline crew members. Pilot Gus Randall (Anthony Steel) is a compulsive gambler who is caught up in a smuggling ring as well as a love triangle; Nick Millbourne (Robert Beatty) is the chief duty officer who wants to get back in the sky and vies with Gus for the attention of stewardess Penny Henson (Eunice Gayson); and passengers Bill Steiner (David Knight) and German Leah Rosch (Margo Lorenz) cross paths on opposite journeys; after their flights are grounded by bad weather, they fall in love. Nick and Penny also find happiness together.

Main cast

 Anthony Steel as Gus Randall
 Robert Beatty as Nick Millbourne
 David Knight as Bill Steiner
 Margo Lorenz as Leah Rosch
 James Robertson Justice as Captain Brent
 Eunice Gayson as Penny Henson
 Isabel Dean as Mrs Malcolm
 Gordon Harker as Taxi Driver
 Bernard Lee as Customs Officer
 Michael Howard as Purvis
 Marie Lohr as Wealthy lady
 Esma Cannon as Lady's Companion
 Abraham Sofaer as Indian man
 Melissa Stribling as Jean Osmond
 Sid James as Gambler
 Barbara Leake as The Gambler's Wife 
 Megs Jenkins as The Landlady 
 Harold Kasket as Hafadi 
 Jack Lambert as Chief Engineer 
 Cyril Luckham as The Doctor
 Nicholas Phipps as Hilton-Davidson
 Terence Alexander as Duty Room Radio Operator
 Charles Farrell as Perce
 Lloyd Lamble as Ben Saunders
 William Franklyn as Control Tower Radio Operator
 Katie Johnson as Worried Passenger

Production

Out of the Clouds is loosely based on the novel The Springboard by John Fores and was adapted by Rex Reinits. The screenplay was written by Michael Relph and John Eldridge.

The film marked a change of pace for Anthony Steel, who was typically cast in war films.

The Ministry of Transport and Civil Aviation co-operated in the production of the film. Technical assistance was provided by BOAC, British European Airways and Pan-American World Airways. Principal photography at London Airport started in early June 1954 with a temporary production office set up at the airport. The film used one of Ealing Studios' largest ever sets to create the interior of the terminal building. An exact replica set of the Heathrow visual control room (air traffic control tower cab) was also built, as filming at the actual location was impractical.

Reception
Out of the Clouds premiered at the Leicester Square Theatre in London on 14 February 1955. It opened up in the United States two years later, on 31 July 1957.

Variety called it "good average entertainment."

Modern views about the film are mixed. Film historian George Perry describes the film in his 1991 book Forever Ealing  as, "... another of Ealing’s attempts at a behind the scenes approach – this time an anatomy of London Airport, a much smaller community in the mid-Fifties than now. Compared with Arthur Hailey’s treatment of the same formula in the Sixties in his novel 'Airport', the result is remarkably tame. As is usual in such Ealing pictures, and in this one more than most, the background and setting are more interesting than the foreground characters, and Paul Beeson’s EastmanColour photography provides a fascinating record of how Heathrow looked in its early days."

The authors of the 2009 book The Cinema of Basil Dearden and Michael Relph conclude that the film's background and its setting are more interesting than its characters. Film historian Charles Barr describes the film as "an acquired value as a period piece" in his 1998 book Ealing Studios.

The US edition of TV Guide writes that, "it has the feel of a soap opera crossed with a documentary," and Leonard Maltin's review is typical of modern critics' view of Out of the Clouds: "Work and play among commercial pilots; nothing special."

Home media
In re-release, Out of the Clouds is the last disc in Ealing Classics 2009, Volume 1.

A restored version, with eight minutes of footage reinserted, was shown on Talking Pictures TV from 2019. The restored scenes can be distinguished by their faded colour.

References

External links
 
 
 
Review of film at Variety

1955 films
1955 drama films
British aviation films
British drama films
Ealing Studios films
Films based on British novels
Films directed by Basil Dearden
Films set in London
Films set in airports
Films scored by Richard Addinsell
Films with screenplays by Michael Relph
1950s English-language films
1950s British films